NGC 396 is a lenticular galaxy located in the constellation Pisces. It was discovered on October 27, 1864 by Albert Marth. It was described by Dreyer as "extremely faint, small, a little extended."

References

External links
 

0396
18641027
Pisces (constellation)
Lenticular galaxies
099944